The 1966–67 National Football League was the 36th staging of the National Football League (NFL), an annual Gaelic football tournament for the Gaelic Athletic Association county teams of Ireland.

Three-in-a-row All-Ireland champions Galway were shocked in the final by a double defeat to a taller and stronger New York side.

Format

Results

Finals

New York win 29–19 on aggregate.

References

National Football League
National Football League
National Football League (Ireland) seasons